Francisco Daniel Martínez (born 4 April 1986) is an Argentine football manager and former professional footballer who played as a defender. He is currently the reserve manager at Sarmiento.

Playing career
Martínez started his career with local club Sarmiento, appearing three times as the club were relegated from the 2004–05 Primera B Nacional; he remained for three further years in Primera B Metropolitana. Argentine Primera División side Arsenal de Sarandí completed the signing of Martínez in 2008, though the defender departed a year later without featuring for their senior team. In 2009, Martínez joined Primera B Nacional's Sportivo Italiano. Four fixtures arrived, including his debut on 29 November against Unión Santa Fe. He had a stint back with Sarmiento in 2011, which took his overall tally there to forty-six matches and four goals.

2012 saw Temperley of Primera B Metropolitana sign Martínez. He scored goals versus Villa San Carlos and Brown in 2011–12 as they finished fifteenth. At the conclusion of that campaign, Martínez agreed to play for Brown in tier three. He was selected five times by manager Pablo Vicó, before leaving midway through 2012–13 to join Racing de Trelew in Torneo Argentino B. In June 2013, Martínez signed with Primera C Metropolitana side Defensores Unidos. Nine appearances followed. He was released in December 2013.

Coaching career
After retiring, Martínez became the manager of Sarmiento's reserves. He guided them to the Apertura title in the Liga Deportiva del Oeste in 2018.

Career statistics

References

External links

1986 births
Living people
People from Junín, Buenos Aires
Argentine footballers
Argentine football managers
Association football defenders
Primera Nacional players
Primera B Metropolitana players
Primera C Metropolitana players
Club Atlético Sarmiento footballers
Arsenal de Sarandí footballers
Sportivo Italiano footballers
Club Atlético Temperley footballers
Club Atlético Brown footballers
Racing de Trelew players
Defensores Unidos footballers
Sportspeople from Buenos Aires Province